Clivina bipustulata is a species of ground beetle in the subfamily Scaritinae. It was described by Johan Christian Fabricius in 1801.

References

bipustulata
Beetles described in 1801